Coldstream was launched at Shields in 1788. She first appeared under the Coldstream name in Lloyd's Register in 1800; her earlier history is currently obscure. Between 1801 and 1805 she made two voyages to the Southern Whale Fishery. A French privateer captured her in 1805 during the second.

Career
Coldstream entered Lloyd's Register in 1800 with J. Gilchrist, master, Mather & Co., owners, and trade London transport. The next year her master became Andrews or Anderson, and her trade London–Cape of Good Hope.

On 7 June 1801 Coldstream, Anderson, master, sailed from Deal for the Cape of Good Hope (CGH). On 21 June she sailed from Gravesend for the CGH. Lloyd's List reported on 5 January 1802 that she had arrived at the CGH. It then reported on 20 August 1802 that she arrived at the CGH from the SSeas. From the CGH she sailed to St Helena and Cowes, and on 1 October she arrived at Gravesend. Commerce was valued in 1802 at £6,600.

On 16 December Coldstream, Dunn, master, remained at Deal, bound for the South Seas. The next day Dunn sailed Coldstream on a whaling voyage to the Brazil Banks. Although she sailed for the Brazil Banks, by 1803 she was at the Galápagos Islands. Coldstream, Backhouse, and Wilding were next reported "all well" at the "Gallipagos" by 4 October.

In February 1805 Coldstream was rounding Cape Horn.

Fate
Lloyd's List reported that the French privateer Bellone, had captured Coldstream, Dunn, master, in June 1805 in sight of St Helena. Coldstreams crew were landed there.

Lloyd's Register
Information in Lloyd's Register and the Register of Shipping was only as accurate as owners of vessel chose to keep it.

Citations

References
 

1788 ships
Merchant ships of England
Whaling ships
Captured ships